is a rechargeable contactless smart card ticketing system for public transport in Niigata, Japan, introduced by Niigata Kotsu.

Usable area
, the card is usable on most of the bus lines operated by Niigata Kotsu. The card cannot be used on JR lines.

Points of purchase
Niigata Station Bandai Exit
Bandai City Bus Center

External links 
  

Niigata (city)
Fare collection systems in Japan
Contactless smart cards